is a  mountain of Tanjō Mountains, located Sakamoto, Yamada, Kita-ku, Kobe, Hyōgo, Japan.

Outline and History 
Mount Taishaku is the second tallest mountain of Tanjō Mountains, which itself is a part of Rokkō Mountains. The name ‘Taishaku’ comes from Śakra a deity of Budhsim.　At the top of this mountain, there was the Okuno-in of the Myōｙōji temple and at the Okuno-in it is said that a sculpture of Śakra was set up.

Access 
 Tanjō Jinja Mae Bus Stop of Kobe City Bus
 Tsukihara Bus Stop of Kobe City Bus

References
 ‘Kansaishuhen no Yama 250’, Yama to Keikokusha Osakashikyoku
 Official Home Page of the Geographical Survey Institute in Japan

Gallery

Taishakusan